The Elswick BL 16.25 inch naval gun was an early British superheavy rifled breech-loading naval gun, commonly known as the 110-ton gun or 111-ton gun.

Service

The adoption of this gun was influenced by the slow rate of production of the preferred new  guns: the Royal Navy had the option of delaying the completion of the new s until sufficient 13.5-inch guns were available to equip them with four guns in two twin barbettes as planned; to use  guns, or to equip them with the new  guns.

For the following  and  the 16.25-inch guns were mounted in pairs in a single turret placed forward.

Weaknesses such as droop and cracking were discovered in the early design, and the many subsequent changes meant that none of the twelve guns built were identical, so the Mk I denomination was discontinued and the individual guns were referred to by their serial numbers. The great weight, low rate of fire and short life of less than 75 rounds meant that the guns were less than successful and were in fact never fired in action.

Ammunition

See also
 List of naval guns

Notes

References
 Text Book of Gunnery , 1902. London: Printed for His Majesty's Stationery Office, by Harrison and Sons, St. Martin's Lane

External links

 "Firing Trial of the 110½ ton B.L. Elswick Gun" in Scientific American supplement, No. 586, 26 March 1887. Transcribed by Project Gutenberg
 N J M Campbell, British Super-Heavy Guns
 Tony DiGiulian, British 16.25"/30 (41.2 cm) Mark I

Naval guns of the United Kingdom
Elswick Ordnance Company
413 mm artillery
Victorian-era weapons of the United Kingdom